Václavov u Bruntálu is a municipality in Bruntál District in the Moravian-Silesian Region of the Czech Republic. It has about 500 inhabitants.

Administrative parts
The municipality is made up of villages of Dolní Václavov and Horní Václavov.

History
According to the Austrian census of 1910 the village had 1,145 inhabitants, all of them were German-speaking. Most populous religious group were Roman Catholics with 99.1%.

References

External links

 

Villages in Bruntál District